Josef Glaser (11 May 1887 in St. Blasien – 12 August 1969 in Freiburg im Breisgau) was a German amateur footballer who played as a midfielder and competed in the 1912 Summer Olympics. He was a member of the German Olympic squad and played one match in the consolation tournament.

References

External links

1887 births
1969 deaths
German footballers
Germany international footballers
Olympic footballers of Germany
Footballers at the 1912 Summer Olympics
German footballers needing infoboxes
Association football midfielders